Squaw Lake is a city in Itasca County, Minnesota, United States. The population was 107 at the 2010 census.

The town center is located along Minnesota State Highway 46. A significant portion of the economy can be attributed to fishing and hunting related tourism.

Geography

Demographics

2010 census
As of the census of 2010, there were 107 people, 39 households, and 26 families living in the city. The racial makeup of the city was 46.7% White, 51.4% Native American, 0.9% Asian, and 0.9% from two or more races.

There were 39 households, of which 41.0% had children under the age of 18 living with them, 35.9% were married couples living together, 28.2% had a female householder with no husband present, 2.6% had a male householder with no wife present, and 33.3% were non-families. 23.1% of all households were made up of individuals, and 7.7% had someone living alone who was 65 years of age or older. The average household size was 2.74 and the average family size was 3.23.

The median age in the city was 35.9 years. 29.9% of residents were under the age of 18; 6.5% were between the ages of 18 and 24; 28.9% were from 25 to 44; 18.8% were from 45 to 64; and 15.9% were 65 years of age or older. The gender makeup of the city was 50.5% male and 49.5% female.

2000 census
As of the census of 2000, there were 99 people, 35 households, and 21 families living in the city. The racial makeup of the city was 63.64% Native American, 31.31% White, 1.01% Asian, and 4.04% from two or more races. Hispanic or Latino of any race were 1.01% of the population.

There were 35 households, out of which 34.3% had children under the age of 18 living with them, 31.4% were married couples living together, 22.9% had a female householder with no husband present, and 40.0% were non-families. 31.4% of all households were made up of individuals, and 20.0% had someone living alone who was 65 years of age or older. The average household size was 2.83 and the average family size was 3.76.

In the city, the population was spread out, with 38.4% under the age of 18, 10.1% from 18 to 24, 23.2% from 25 to 44, 16.2% from 45 to 64, and 12.1% who were 65 years of age or older. The median age was 26 years. For every 100 females, there were 98.0 males. For every 100 females age 18 and over, there were 79.4 males.

The median income for a household in the city was $11,875, and the median income for a family was $31,250. Males had a median income of $12,000 versus $20,000 for females. The per capita income for the city was $9,895. There were 42.1% of families and 49.5% of the population living below the poverty line, including 64.0% of under eighteens and 50.0% of those over 64.

References

Cities in Itasca County, Minnesota
Cities in Minnesota